Bagmara is an Upazila of Rajshahi District in the Division of Rajshahi, Bangladesh.

Geography
It has 57675 households and total area 363.3 km2.

Demographics
According to 2011 Bangladesh census, Bagmara had a population of 354,664. Males constituted 49.95% of the population and females 50.05%. Muslims formed 95.31% of the population, Hindus 4.65% and others 0.04%. Bagmara had a literacy rate of 46.31% for the population 7 years and above.

As of the 1991 Bangladesh census, Bagmara has a population of 282520. Males constitute 50.01% of the population, and females 49.99%. This Upazila's eighteen up population is 147768. Bagmara has an average literacy rate of 52.9% (7+ years), and the national average of 32.4% literate.

Administration
Bagmara Upazila is divided into Bhawbaniganj Municipality, Tahirpur Municipality, and 16 union parishads: Auchpara, Basupara, Borobihanoli, Dippur, Ganipur, Gobindapara, Gualkandi, Hamirkutsa, Jogipara, Kacharikoalipara, Maria, Nordas, Sonadanaga, Sreepur, Suvodanga, and Zhikra. The union parishads are subdivided into 292 mauzas and 332 villages.

Notable residents
 Abdus Sattar Mondal was Member of Parliament twice for constituencies encompassing Bagmara Upazila.

See also
Upazilas of Bangladesh
Districts of Bangladesh
Divisions of Bangladesh

References

Upazilas of Rajshahi District